Stephen Stubbs (born 1951) is a lutenist and music director and has been a leading figure in the American early music scene for nearly thirty years.

Born in Seattle, he studied harpsichord and composition at the University of Washington where, at the same time, he began playing the harpsichord and the lute. He left America after graduation to study the instrument in England and Holland and gave his debut concert in London's Wigmore Hall in 1976. From 1981 to 2013, Stubbs taught at the University of the Arts Bremen in Germany. In 2013, he became an artist in residence at the University of Washington in Seattle. He has performed extensively with his ensembles Tragicomedia and Teatro Lirico, and conducted baroque operas worldwide. He has recorded numerous albums with other famous ensembles like the Hilliard Ensemble and with Andrew Lawrence-King.

He moved back to Seattle in 2006. There he established the Seattle Academy of Baroque Opera, the Pacific MusicWorks early music performance series, and is an adjunct professor at Cornish College of the Arts. He is artistic co-director (with Paul O'Dette) of the Boston Early Music Festival.

On February 8, 2015, Stephen was accompanied by his wife in Los Angeles as he won a Grammy Award for Best Opera Recording for: Charpentier: La descente d'Orphée aux enfers H 488 & La Couronne de fleurs H.486, Paul O'Dette & Stephen Stubbs, conductors; Aaron Sheehan; Renate Wolter-Seevers, producer (Boston Early Music Festival Chamber Ensemble; Boston Early Music Festival Vocal Ensemble). In 2013, he recorded : Charpentier’s  Actéon H.481, La Pierre Philosophale H.501 and in 2019 Les Plaisirs de Versailles H.480, Les Arts Florissants H.487.

Selected Recordings

 Johann Georg Conradi, Ariadne, Boston Early music Festival Orchestra & Chorus, conducted by Paul O'Dette & Stephen Stubbs 3 CDs CPO 2004
 Jean-Baptiste Lully, Thésée, Boston Early Festival Vocal & Chamber Ensembles, conducted by Paul O'Dette & Stephen Stubbs 3 CDs CPO 2007
 Jean-Baptiste Lully, Psyché, Boston Early Festival Orchestra & Chorus, conducted by Paul O'Dette & Stephen Stubbs 3 CDs CPO 2007
 Marc-Antoine Charpentier, Actéon H.481, La Pierre Philososphale H.501, Boston Early Festival Vocal & Chamber Ensembles, conducted by Paul O'Dette e& Stephen Stubbs CD CPO 2010
 John Blow, Vénus et Adonis, Boston Early Festival Vocal & Chamber Ensembles, conducted by Paul O'Dette & Stephen Stubbs CD CPO 2011
 Marc-Antoine Charpentier, La Descente d'Orphée aux Enfers H.488, La Couronne de fleurs H.486, Boston Early Festival Vocal & Chamber Ensembles, conducted by Paul O'Dette et Stephen Stubbs CD CPO 2013
 Johann Sebastiani, Matthäus Passion, Boston Early music Festival Chamber Ensemble, conducted by Paul O'Dette & Stephen Stubbs CD CPO 2007
 George Frideric Handel, Acis and Galatea, Boston Early Music Festival Vocal & Chamber Ensembles, conducted by Paul O'Dette & Stephen Stubbs 2 CDs CPO 2013
 Agostino Stefanni, Niobe Regina di Tebe, Boston early Music Festival Orchestra, conducted by Paul O'Dette et Stephen Stubbs 3 CDs CPO 2015
 Agostino Stefanni, Duets of Love and Passion, Boston Early music Festival Chamber Ensemble, conducted by Paul O'Dette & Stephen Stubbs CD CPO 2017
 George Frideric Handel, Almira, Boston Early Music Festival Orchestra, conducted by Paul O'Dette & Stephen Stubbs 4 CDs CPO 2018
 Marc-Antoine Charpentier, Les Plaisirs de Versailles H.480, Les Arts Florissants H.487, Boston Early Festival Vocal & Chamber Ensembles, conducted by Paul O'Dette & Stephen Stubbs CD CPO 2019
 Michel-Richard de Lalande, Les Fontaines de Versailles, Le Concert d'Esculape, Boston Early Festival Vocal & Chamber Ensembles, conducted by Paul O'Dette & Stephen Stubbs CD CPO 2020

References

American performers of early music
American lutenists
Living people
1951 births
Cornish College of the Arts faculty
Academic staff of the University of the Arts Bremen
Grammy Award winners